The concept of biological computation proposes that living organisms perform computations, and that as such, abstract ideas of information and computation may be key to understanding biology. As a field, biological computation can include the study of the systems biology computations performed by biota the design of algorithms inspired by the computational methods of biota, the design and engineering of manufactured computational devices using synthetic biology components and computer methods for the analysis of biological data, elsewhere called computational biology or bioinformatics.

According to Dominique Chu, Mikhail Prokopenko, and J. Christian J. Ray, "the most important class of natural computers can be found in biological systems that perform computation on multiple levels. From molecular and cellular information processing networks to ecologies, economies and brains, life computes. Despite ubiquitous agreement on this fact going back as far as von Neumann automata and McCulloch–Pitts neural nets, we so far lack principles to understand rigorously how computation is done in living, or active, matter".

Logical circuits can be built with slime moulds. Distributed systems experiments have used them to approximate motorway graphs. The slime mould Physarum polycephalum is able to compute high-quality approximate solutions to the Traveling Salesman Problem, a combinatorial test with exponentially increasing complexity, in linear time. Fungi such as basidiomycetes can also be used to build logical circuits. In a proposed fungal computer, information is represented by spikes of electrical activity, a computation is implemented in a mycelium network, and an interface is realized via fruit bodies.

See also 

 Wetware
 Biological neural network
 Artificial neuron
 Biological computing
 Zero player game

References

Computational biology
Computational fields of study